Consolea moniliformis is a species of cactus that is native to the Greater Antilles, on Cuba, Hispaniola (the Dominican Republic and Haiti), and Puerto Rico (on the islands of Mona, Culebra and Desecheo).

Ecology and habitat
Consolea moniliformis can be found at elevations from sea level to about 50 metres. 
In Cuba, it occurs in dry littoral forest. It also occurs on limestone. In Puerto Rico, it occurs in open dry forests and is sparsely distributed. In Santiago de Cuba it is cultivated in gardens. It occurs abundantly. Its population is male-biased throughout the range. It is unknown whether there is seedling recruitment in the wild. Damage from Cactoblastis cactorum was not recorded in Dominican populations, but moderately present in Puerto Rican populations. Deforestation in Haiti has led to the suspicion of its extirpation there.

Description

It is a tree-like cactus species to 4(-7) m height, freely branching in the crowns. In this species, as in a few other opuntias, the fruits are quite proliferous, often in long chains of 2-5 (or more) individuals or forming compound clusters. They hang on for a number of years and usually remaining green. They are, however, easily detached, and, when falling to the ground, they readily take root and start new colonies.

Common names in various languages
Common names include:
 English: necklacelike pricklypear
 French: Opuntia patte-de-tortue, patte de tortue, patte tortue, raquette espagnole (Haiti)
Spanish: alpargata (Dominican Republic), tuna (Puerto Rico)
Haitian Creole: pat tôti, rakèt panyôl

References

Bibliography
 
 
 

Opuntioideae
Plants described in 1926
Taxa named by Alwin Berger
Taxa named by Carl Linnaeus
Flora of the Caribbean
Flora of the Dominican Republic
Flora of Haiti
Flora of Cuba
Flora of Puerto Rico